The ACM Symposium on Principles of Database Systems (PODS) is an international research conference on database theory, and has been held yearly since 1982. It is sponsored by three Association for Computing Machinery SIGs, SIGART, SIGACT, and SIGMOD. Since 1991, PODS has been held jointly with the ACM SIGMOD Conference, a research conference on systems aspects of data management.

External links
 
 dblp: Symposium on Principles of Database Systems (PODS)

Database theory
Computer science conferences
Association for Computing Machinery conferences